Software Arts was a software company founded by Dan Bricklin and Bob Frankston in 1979 to develop VisiCalc, which was published by a separate company, Personal Software Inc., later named VisiCorp.

Software Arts also developed TK!Solver, a numeric equation solving system originally developed by Milos Konopasek, and Spotlight, "a desktop organizer for the I.B.M. Personal Computer."

By early 1984 InfoWorld estimated that Software Arts was the world's 13th-largest microcomputer-software company, with $12 million in 1983 sales. It was bought by Lotus in 1985.

References

External links
Software Arts and VisiCalc, by Dan Bricklin

Defunct computer companies based in Massachusetts
Software companies established in 1979
Software companies disestablished in 1985
1979 establishments in Massachusetts
1985 disestablishments in Massachusetts